Jinnah Park is a public park located in Peshawar city of Khyber Pakhtunkhwa province of Pakistan.

Overview and History 
Jinnah Park is located on the Grand Trunk (GT) Road opposite to Balahisar Fort in Peshawar. It was called Cunningham Park in the past. In July 1947, British government held referendum regarding partition and joining of NWFP (now Khyber Pakhtunkhwa) either to India and Pakistan in Jinnah Park then Cunningham Park. In 2011, the Government of Khyber Pakhtunkhwa constructed digital fountain in the park.

See also 
 Shahi Bagh
 Wazir Bagh Peshawar
 Army Stadium Peshawar

References 

Peshawar
Peshawar District
Tourist attractions in Peshawar
Parks in Pakistan
Parks in Khyber Pakhtunkhwa